Harold Edwards (7 September 1909 – 1993), also known by the nickname of "The Welsh Bull", was a Welsh professional rugby league footballer who played in the 1930s and 1940s.

Background
Harold Edwards as born in Risca, Wales, and he died aged .

Playing career

International honours
Edwards won 2 caps for Wales in 1935–1938 while at Wigan, and Bradford Northern.

Championship final appearances
Edwards played right-, i.e. number 10, in Wigan's 15-3 victory over Salford in the Championship Final during the 1933–34 season at Wilderspool Stadium, Warrington on Saturday 28 April 1934.

Notable tour matches
Edwards played right-, i.e. number 10, in Wigan's 30-27 victory over France at Central Park, Wigan, on Saturday 10 March 1934.

References

External links
Statistics at wigan.rlfans.com

1909 births
1993 deaths
Bradford Bulls players
People from Risca
Rugby league players from Caerphilly County Borough
Rugby league players from Newport, Wales
Rugby league props
Wales national rugby league team players
Welsh rugby league players
Wigan Warriors players